3,5-Dimethylpyrazole is an organic compound with the formula (CH3C)2CHN2H.  It is one of several isomeric derivatives of pyrazole that contain two methyl substituents.  The compound is unsymmetrical but the corresponding conjugate acid (pyrazolium) and conjugate base (pyrazolide) have C2v symmetry.  It is a white solid that dissolves well in polar organic solvents.

It is a precursor to a variety of ligands that are widely studied in coordination chemistry including trispyrazolylborate, a trispyrazolylmethane, and a pyrazolyldiphosphine. 

Condensation of acetylacetone and hydrazine gives 3,5-dimethylpyrazole:
CH3C(O)CH2C(O)CH3   +   N2H4   →   (CH3C)2CHN2H   +   2 H2O

It has found use as a blocking agent for isocyanates.

References

Pyrazoles